The following are the national records in track cycling in Cuba maintained by the Cuban Cycling Federation.

Men

Women

References

External links

Cuba
Records
Track cycling
track cycling